Dennis Warmerdam (born 6 August 1994) is a Dutch field hockey player who plays as a forward for Hoofdklasse club Bloemendaal and the Dutch national team.

Club career
Warmerdam played 12 years for Pinoké before he moved to Bloemendaal for the 2022–23 season.

International career

Under–21
Warmerdam made his debut for the Netherlands U–21 team in 2014 at the EuroHockey Junior Championship in Waterloo. At the tournament he won a gold medal.

He appeared in the junior team a final time in 2015, captaining the team during a test series in Breda.

Oranje
Warmerdam made his senior debut for the Oranje in 2021 during season three of the FIH Pro League.

He was officially named in the national squad for the first time in 2022.

References

External links

1994 births
Living people
Dutch male field hockey players
Male field hockey forwards
Men's Hoofdklasse Hockey players
HC Bloemendaal players